The Johnson C. Smith Golden Bulls are the athletic teams that represent Johnson C. Smith University, located in Charlotte, North Carolina, in intercollegiate sports at the Division II level of the National Collegiate Athletic Association (NCAA), primarily competing in the Central Intercollegiate Athletic Association since the 1926–27 academic year.

Conference affiliations 
NCAA
 Independent (1892–1925)
 Central Intercollegiate Athletic Association (1926–present)

Varsity teams

Basketball 

In 2001 the men's basketball team won the CIAA Basketball Tournament and advanced to the Division II Elite Eight. In 2006 the men’s and women’s basketball teams were the CIAA Western Division Champions and the Tournament Runners-up. In 2007 the men's basketball team were the 2007 CIAA Western Division Champions. In 2008 the men's basketball team won the 2008 CIAA Men's Basketball Championship. In 2009 the men's and women's basketball team won the 2009 CIAA basketball championship. Fact, the "Brayboy Madness" is famous—Sports Illustrated named it "One of the Loudest Gymnasiums in the Country."

Football

Commemorative Classic: "The Birth of Black College Football" 
On December 27, 1892, Livingstone College and Biddle College, (Johnson C. Smith) University played in the snows of Salisbury, North Carolina, just two days after Christmas. A writer of a story in the 1930 year-book of Livingstone College provided a glimpse of that December experience when the team from Biddle Institute traveled to Livingstone's Old Delta Grove campus in Salisbury to play while writers recorded the results of a historic moment in sports history.

According to historian T.M. Martin, the men of Biddle spent two years studying and practicing the sport of football. In 1892, they challenged the men of Livingstone, whose team was formally organized in the fall of that year.

Bowl games 
Johnson C. Smith has made 6 bowl game appearances, winning 4 and losing 2. After an initial appearance in a postseason contest in the 1942 Flower Bowl against Lane College in a shutout, 13–0.

Notable alumni

Football 
Gregory Clifton
Tim Beamer
Grover Covington
Bill Davis
De'Audra Dix
Bill Dusenbery
Chet Grimsley
Tim Harkness
Benny Johnson
Eddie McGirt
Tim Newman
Pettis Norman
John Taylor
John Terry
Bob Wells

Basketball 
Tyrone Britt
Quentin Hillsman
Edward Joyner
Earl Manigault
Fred "Curly" Neal
Trevin Parks
James "Twiggy" Sanders
Draff Young

Baseball 
Mickey Casey
Bun Hayes
William Lindsay
Steel Arm Johnny Taylor
Orval Tucker

Track and Field 
Leford Green
Vincent Matthews
Danielle Williams
Shermaine Williams

References

External links